Gaurav Wadhwa is an Indian television actor from Jaipur, Rajasthan. He is best known for his roles in Thapki Pyar Ki,  Ye Hai Mohabbatein and Yeh Rishta Kya Kehlata Hai. He played the main lead role  in Super Sisters - Chalega Pyaar Ka Jaadu.

He used to  run a Youtube channel called RiMoRav Vlogs along with his former co-stars Rishi Dev and Mohena Singh. RiMoRav broke up due to some undisclosed reason and the channel was passed on to Rishi Dev with the title Rimorav Vlogs presents Ri vlogs.. Gaurav has his own YouTube channel named Gaurav Wadhwa.

He is the younger brother of actor Nirbhay Wadhwa.

Television

References

External links
 

21st-century Indian male actors
Living people
Indian male television actors
Male actors in Hindi television
Male actors from Jaipur
People from Jaipur
1993 births